Let's Make a Night of It is a 1937 British musical comedy film directed by Graham Cutts and starring Charles "Buddy" Rogers, June Clyde and Claire Luce. The screenplay concerns a husband and his wife, who acquire rival nightclubs at the same time. It was based on the play The Silver Spoon by Henrik Ege. It was distributed in America by Universal Pictures the following year.

Cast
 Charles "Buddy" Rogers as Jack Kent
 June Clyde as Peggy Boydell
 Claire Luce as Viola Vanders
 Fred Emney as Henry Boydell
 Iris Hoey as Laura Boydell
 Jack Melford as Count Castelli
 Claud Allister as Monty
 Steven Geray as Luigi
 Anthony Holles as Head Waiter
 Lawrence Anderson as Harold
 Zelma O'Neal as Kitty
 Bertha Belmore as Police sergeant
 Syd Wakefield as Policeman
 Dan Donovan as Street Singer
 Brian Michie as Compere

References

Bibliography
 Low, Rachael. Filmmaking in 1930s Britain. George Allen & Unwin, 1985.
 Wood, Linda. British Films, 1927-1939. British Film Institute, 1986.

External links

1937 films
British musical comedy films
1937 musical comedy films
Films shot at Associated British Studios
British films based on plays
Films directed by Graham Cutts
British black-and-white films
1930s English-language films
1930s British films